Rezvan (also Romanized as Reẕvān; also known as Sū Dāghelān, Sūdāghlān, and Sūdoqlān) is a village in Rezvan Rural District, Kalpush District, Meyami County, Semnan Province, Iran. At the 2006 census, its population was 1,067, in 276 families.

References 

Populated places in Meyami County